Prior to the amendment of Tamil Nadu Entertainments Tax Act 1939 on 12 June 2000, Gross was 130 per cent of Nett for all films. Post-amendment, Gross fell to 125 per cent of Nett. Commercial Taxes Department disclosed 6 crore in entertainment tax revenue for the year.

A list of films produced in the Tamil film industry in India in 2000 by release date:

Films

January — March

April — June

July — September

October — December

Other releases
The following films also released in 2000, though the release date remains unknown.

Awards

References

2000
Films, Tamil
Lists of 2000 films by country or language
2000s Tamil-language films